2017 in Korea may refer to:
2017 in North Korea
2017 in South Korea